A women's ice hockey tournament has been played at every Winter Olympics since its introduction at the 1998 Nagano Olympics. The International Olympic Committee (IOC) voted to include women's hockey as an Olympic event in July 1992.

Finland has won four Olympic bronze medals in women's hockey, including the first bronze medal in women's ice hockey at the Winter Olympic games.

Key

Goaltenders

Skaters
Sources:

See also

Finland women's national ice hockey team
List of Finland women's national ice hockey team rosters
List of Olympic men's ice hockey players for Finland

References
Player information and statistics from:
Finnish Ice Hockey Association; Liiga (2019). Aaltonen, Juha (ed.). Jääkiekkokirja 2019–2020 (PDF) (in Finnish). Helsinki: Uusi Suomi/Kiekkolehti. ISSN 0784-3321. OCLC 476321083.

Finland
Finland

Ice hockey
Ice hockey
Ice hockey
Finland
Women's ice hockey in Finland
Finland women's national ice hockey team